Dulab-e Karanlu (also Romanized as Dūlāb-e Karānlū; also known as Dūlāb-e Kavānlū) is a village in Minjavan-e Gharbi Rural District, Minjavan District, Khoda Afarin County, East Azerbaijan Province, Iran. At the 2006 census, its population was 181, in 40 families.

References 

Populated places in Khoda Afarin County